The Giants (強人) is a TVB television series, premiered on 15 May 1978. Theme song "The Giants" (強人) composition and arrangement by Joseph Koo, lyricist by Wong Jim, sung by Roman Tam.

1978 Hong Kong television series debuts
1978 Hong Kong television series endings
TVB dramas
Cantonese-language television shows

zh:強人 (電視劇)